The 1887 All-Ireland Senior Football Championship is the first edition of GAA's premier inter-county Gaelic football tournament, played between 12 counties of Ireland. The tournament featured club teams who represented their respective counties after their county championship. The 21 a-side final was between Commercials of Limerick and Young Irelands of Louth. The final was played in Beech Hill, Donnybrook on April 29, 1888, with Commercials winning by 1-4 to 0-3. Unlike later All-Irelands, there were no provincial championships and it was an open draw.

Format
The 1887 championship was the only to be held as an open-draw knockout tournament, without provincial championships.

Representative clubs

From 1887 until 1891 the club champions represented the whole county.  In the very first All-Ireland championship the participating counties were represented by the following clubs:

Results

First round

Second round

Semi-final

Final

Winning Team
R. Breen
E. Casey
W. Cleary
D. Corbett
T. Fitzgibbon
P. Kelly
J. Hyland
P.J. Corbett
T. Keating
T. Kennedy
J. Kennedy
W. Gunning
P. Keating
W. Spain
R. Normoyle
M. O'Brien
E. Nicholas
T. McNamara
M. Slattery
J. Mulqueen
P. Reeves

Championship statistics

Miscellaneous
 No Provincial championships in the first year of the championship.